Jay Feinberg (born August 1968 in New York City) is a long-term leukemia survivor, community organizer and founder and current CEO of the Gift of Life Marrow Registry.

Leukemia, and search for a donor
Feinberg was a 22-year-old foreign-exchange analyst for the Federal Reserve in New York in 1991, just starting law school when he was diagnosed with leukemia and told that a bone marrow transplant was his only hope. A matching donor was not found in Feinberg's immediate family. Knowing that tissue type is influenced by one's ethnic background - inherited like eye color, his friends and relatives widened their search to the unrelated population, focusing on increasing the representation of Ashkenazi Jews.

Feinberg's plight, along with that of Mario Cooper, a graphic design artist, and Erskine Henderson, an attorney at Skadden Arps, was featured in a 1991 New York Times article.  Massive screenings were organized in Jewish communities throughout North America and Israel. In addition, screenings were held in Belarus (by Arnie Draiman and Bill Begal), Australia and South Africa.

By 1995, more than 55,000 people had been tested. Feinberg's condition was rapidly deteriorating and only a partial match had been found. A friend in Milwaukee organized one last drive and teenager Becky Faibisoff, a 16-year-old girl from Illinois, was found to be a match. Feinberg received his successful transplant at the Fred Hutchinson Cancer Research Center in Seattle, WA.

The Gift of Life Marrow Registry
Feinberg's experience led him to devote his life to building a movement to educate and encourage people to add themselves to bone marrow registries around the world and improve the effectiveness and efficiency of donor Registry operations and strategy. The Gift of Life Marrow Registry, the Florida-based organization of which he is founder and CEO, seeks to increase ethnic diversity in the global donor pool. This is because tissue type is inherited, like eye or hair color, so a patient's best chance of finding a genetic match lies with those of similar background. The recruitment model Feinberg created for increasing the representation of Jewish donors in the registry during his own donor search, has since been replicated to help increase representation of donors of African America, Hispanic, Asian and Native American backgrounds.

Feinberg helped the organization to become a world leader in its field.

Dr. Miriam and Sheldon G. Adelson Gift of Life - Be The Match Collection Center
In 2019, Feinberg led the establishment of the world's first registry-integrated stem cell collection center, based at Gift of Life's headquarters in Boca Raton, Florida. There were two reasons for this new facility. First, Feinberg wanted to re-engineer the donor experience, providing apheresis services in a non-hospital setting that provided donors with all the amenities of a spa-like experience. Second, to expedite the time to transplant for patients, by limiting the collection center solely to peripheral blood stem cell collections for the registry.

Awards
 In 1999, Feinberg was awarded the Hadassah International’s Citizen of the World Award.
In 2004, Feinberg was awarded the Charles Bronfman Prize for his dedication to the fight against leukemia and his service to the Jewish community.
 In 2005, he was awarded an honorary doctorate by Yeshiva University, along with Senator Hillary Rodham Clinton. 
 In 2010, he was awarded the Jewish Community Hero Award for his inspiring service to both the Jewish community and all those in need of bone marrow transplants by  Jewish Federations of North America. 
 In 2013, Feinberg was named one of the top one hundred individuals who have positively influenced Jewish life this past year for innovation by The Algemeiner Jewish 100. 
 In late 2013, Feinberg received the prestigious Eisendrath Bearer of Light Award, the highest honor bestowed by the Reform Movement.
In 2016, Feinberg was awarded the Community Leadership Award at Areyvut’s Fifth Annual Bergen County Breakfast for his service and leadership.

Trivia
Feinberg graduated Phi Beta Kappa from Dickinson College in 1990 with a major in political science
An honorary brother of Alpha Epsilon Pi fraternity
Inaugural recipient of the Charles Bronfman Prize
Inaugural recipient of the National Marrow Donor Program's Allison Atlas Award
Established the very first bone marrow registry dedicated to increasing representation of donors of Jewish ethnic background to diversify the donor pool

References

External links
Gift of Life Marrow Registry
Videos about Gift of Life and Jay Feinberg
Yeshiva University Honorary Doctorate
1995 Article detailing Jay's fight with Leukemia
Hadassah International World Citizen Award
National Marrow Donor Program Allison Atlas Award
Inaugural recipient of the Charles Bronfman Prize
Jay Feinberg Wins Jewish Community Hero Contest

1969 births
People from Long Island
Living people
21st-century American Jews